The  is a zoo and botanical garden located on the grounds of the Amami Cultural Foundation, Yanma 811-1, Sumiyo-cho, Amami, Kagoshima, Japan. It is open daily except Tuesdays and Wednesdays; an admission fee is charged.

The garden contains a collection of more than 500 types of cactus and succulents, bananas, tropical fruit trees, and a greenhouse with begonias, calathea, heliconia, orchids, etc. The zoo contains animals such as meerkat, ring-tailed lemur, and squirrel monkey, as well as an aquarium. The cultural center features indigenous art of Southeast Asia.

See also 
 List of botanical gardens in Japan

References 
 Amami Islands Botanical Garden (Japanese)
 Jardins Botaniques Japonais (French)

Botanical gardens in Japan
Gardens in Kagoshima Prefecture
Zoos in Japan
Articles needing infobox zoo